The Electoral cycle of Turkey is composed of three different types of elections, namely general elections every five years, local elections every five years and presidential elections every five years. Occasionally, referendums may be held if at least 360 Members of Parliament in the Grand National Assembly vote in favour of a constitutional amendment. Elections are overseen by the Supreme Electoral Council of Turkey.

Elections

A summary of the purpose of each type of election is as follows.
general elections in order to elect 600 Members of Parliament to the Grand National Assembly using the D'Hondt method, a party-list proportional representation system. Held every five years (last held 24 June 2018; next one scheduled for 2023)
local elections in order to elect metropolitan and municipal mayors, as well as provincial and municipal mayors councillors. Held every five years (last held: 31 March 2019, next one scheduled for 2024)
presidential elections, in order to elect the President of Turkey using a two-round system. Held every five years (last held: 24 June 2018; next one scheduled for 2023)
Referendums, held if three-fifths (360) of the members of parliament vote in favour of a constitutional change that is then put to the electorate (last held: 16 April 2017)

Historical changes

The 2007 constitutional referendum brought about significant changes to the Turkish electoral system, lowering the parliamentary terms from five years to four. As a result, general elections are now held every four years rather than five. Furthermore, the constitutional changes adopted in the referendum made the President elected by direct ballot rather than indirectly within parliament as had previously been the case. Before 2014, presidential elections were held every seven years by MPs, but are now held directly every five years. The incumbent may seek re-election once for a maximum of two terms, whereas the term limit for previous presidents elected indirectly were capped at one term.

With 2017 referendum, Turkey adopted semi-presidential republic system. Parliamentary terms reverted into five years, prime ministry dissolved and MP numbers increased.

Electoral cycle since 1923

Elections in Turkey